Oleksii Sergiiovich Makeiev (born  in Kyiv) is a Ukrainian diplomat who has been serving as Ambassador of Ukraine to Germany under President Volodymyr Zelenskyy since .

Early life and education 

He graduated from the Institute of International Relations at Taras Shevchenko National University of Kyiv in 1997.

Career 

Makeiev began his diplomatic career at the Ministry of Foreign Affairs in 1996. Prior to 2014, he worked at Ukraine's diplomatic missions in Germany and Switzerland. He was made political director of the Ministry of Foreign Affairs of Ukraine in 2014. As political director, he was involved in the negotiation of the Minsk agreements with Russia, Germany and France.  In 2020, he became the special representative for sanctions policy.

Personal life 

Oleksii Makeiev is married to Olena Makeieva, who was deputy minister of finance from 2015 to 2016.  They have one daughter.

Makeiev is fluent in English, German, and Russian.  He can also speak French and Spanish.

References 

1975 births
Living people
21st-century diplomats
Ambassadors of Ukraine to Germany
Diplomats from Kyiv
Taras Shevchenko National University of Kyiv, Institute of International Relations alumni

uk:Макеєв Олексій Сергійович